The Macomber Affair is a 1947 film directed by Zoltan Korda and distributed by United Artists. Set in British East Africa, its plot concerns a fatal love triangle involving a frustrated wife, a weak husband, and the professional hunter who comes between them. It stars Gregory Peck, Joan Bennett, and Robert Preston.

The screenplay was written by Casey Robinson and Seymour Bennett and adapted by Bennett and Frank Arnold, based on "The Short Happy Life of Francis Macomber", the 1936 Ernest Hemingway short story.

The film was re-released in 1952 by Lippert Pictures as The Great White Hunter.

Plot
The film opens in the Kenya Colony of British East Africa. Distraught American Margaret "Margot" Macomber was unhappily married to her American husband, Francis Macomber. As she and their guide, Robert Wilson, an English big-game hunter land in Nairobi, Kenya, Francis is dead from a gunshot wound to the back of his head.

A flashback pans back before Francis’ death.  He and Robert meet at the Norfolk Hotel to plan their safari over a whiskey.

Francis, a wealthy man, then alienates his wife with his displays of cowardice and physical delicateness while on the trip. Margo is attracted to Robert, so, to prove his masculinity, Francis sets out to kill a lion. He succeeds only in wounding it. Robert insists the animal must be tracked and killed so it will not suffer. When the wounded lion charges, Francis runs and Robert must dispatch it. Francis is repeatedly, and accidentally, emasculated by Robert throughout the day. A furious Margot humiliates her husband by kissing Robert on the lips.

As the couple's animosity grows, Francis is cruel and abusive to an African servant and Robert has to restrain him. The next morning, Francis wounds a cape buffalo with a courageous shot, comes to terms with his physical weaknesses, reconciles with Wilson (to whom he also expresses forgiveness for his wife), and thereby becomes a man.  When the wounded cape buffalo charges and is not immediately dropped by shots from Macomber and Wilson, Margot takes aim and shoots. Her bullet strikes Francis dead.

Robert tries to get her to admit that the shot was accidental as Margot prepares to go on trial.  It is left unclear whether she intentionally shot her husband or merely feels guilt that the accident validated what was in her heart.

Cast
 Gregory Peck as Robert Wilson 
 Joan Bennett as Margaret "Margot" Macomber 
 Robert Preston as Francis Macomber
 Reginald Denny as Police Inspector
 Jean Gillie as Aimee
 Carl Harbord as Coroner
 Vernon Downing as Reporter Logan
 Frederick Worlock as Clerk

Reviews
Variety wrote, "African footage is cut into the story with showmanship effect, and these sequences build up suspense satisfactorily", "scenes in which lions and water buffalos charge...will stir any audience." and while it has some "unreal dialogue", the film's "action is often exciting and elements of suspense frequently hop up the spectator;"

Bosley Crowther, in The New York Times, said the film, except for the beginning and the end, was a "quite credible screen telling" of a short story Hemingway felt was one of his best. Crowther also said that "it makes for a tight and absorbing study of character on the screen" if you ignore what the producers added at the beginning and the end. Crowther's review opined that "the contrived conclusion that the guide has fallen in love with the dame and that possibly the shooting was accidental is completely stupid and false".

Time Magazine said it was a "brilliantly good job -the best job yet of Hemingway to the screen."

References

External links
 
 
 
 
 The Macomber Affair essay by Moira Finnie at Turner Classic Movies - Movie Morlocks

1947 films
1940s adventure drama films
American adventure drama films
American black-and-white films
Film noir
American psychological drama films
Films based on short fiction
Films based on works by Ernest Hemingway
Films about hunters
Films set in Kenya
United Artists films
Films directed by Zoltán Korda
Films scored by Miklós Rózsa
1947 drama films
1940s English-language films
1940s American films